Charles Cavendish Stewart Cox (18 February 1873 – 26 August 1947) was an Australian rules footballer who played with St Kilda in the Victorian Football League (VFL).

References

External links 

1873 births
1947 deaths
Australian rules footballers from Melbourne
St Kilda Football Club players
People from North Melbourne